Santa's Workshop in North Pole, a hamlet in Wilmington, New York, is an amusement park that has been in operation since 1949. It was one of the first theme parks in the United States. It is open from June to December.

The idea for the village originated in a story that Lake Placid businessman Julian Reiss told his daughter about a baby bear who visits Santa Claus at the North Pole. The design of the park was done by artist Arto Monaco, of Upper Jay, and built by Harold Fortune, of Lake Placid, who also owned the site, and helped promote the park. The park drew immediate media interest, with more than 14,000 visitors on one day in September 1951.

The COVID-19 pandemic caused the 2020 season to go on hiatus.

See also
Christmas in the United States, post-War

References

External links

Official site

Amusement parks in New York (state)
Santa Claus
Buildings and structures in Essex County, New York
Tourist attractions in Essex County, New York
1949 establishments in New York (state)
Amusement parks opened in 1949